Martin Barnaby Madden (March 21, 1855 – April 27, 1928) was a U.S. Representative from Illinois. He belonged to the Republican Party. As of 2020, he is the last non-African American to serve as a representative for Illinois's 1st congressional district.

Biography
Born in 1855 in Wolviston, County Durham, England, Madden immigrated to the United States in 1869 with his parents, who were born in Ireland. They settled near Lemont, Illinois. He attended public school in Chicago and graduated from Bryant and Stratton Business College in 1873. He also graduated from an engineering trade school.

Madden served as president of the Quarry Owners' Association of the United States 1885–1889. He served as vice president and director of the Builders' and Traders' Exchange of Chicago in 1886 and 1887.

A member of the Republican Party, he was elected and served several years as a member of the Chicago City Council 1889–1897. He served as presiding officer of that body 1891–1893 and chairman of the finance committee for seven years. He served as chairman of the Republican Committee of Chicago 1890–1896.

Gaining greater influence, he was chosen as a delegate to the Republican National Conventions in 1896, 1900, 1912, 1916 and 1924. In 1902 he was an unsuccessful candidate for election to the Fifty-eighth Congress.

Madden continued to serve in several leadership positions in business: as president of the Western Stone Co. 1895–1915. He served as a director of the Metropolitan Trust & Savings Bank of Chicago 1895–1910.

Madden was elected in 1904 as a Republican to the Fifty-ninth and to the eleven succeeding Congresses, serving from March 4, 1905, until his death. He served as chairman of the influential Committee on Appropriations (Sixty-eighth through Seventieth Congresses).

After having been nominated for reelection to the Seventy-first Congress, Madden died in 1928 at age 73 in the Committee on Appropriations meeting room of the House of Representatives in the U.S. Capitol in Washington, D.C. He was buried at Cass Cemetery, near Hinsdale, Illinois, as was his wife Josephine six years later. Today Cass Cemetery is located in incorporated Darien, Illinois.

Legacy
In 1935, the Madden Dam on the Chagres River in the Panama Canal water system was named after him, as was the reservoir behind it, Madden Lake. That was renamed by Panama as Lake Alajuela.

Electoral history

See also
List of United States Congress members who died in office (1900–49)

References

External links
 

1855 births
1928 deaths
People from the Borough of Stockton-on-Tees
Bryant and Stratton College alumni
Chicago City Council members
English emigrants to the United States
Republican Party members of the United States House of Representatives from Illinois
People from Lemont, Illinois